The Chapel of the Immaculate Conception, Franciscan Convent is a Roman Catholic chapel run by the Missionary Franciscan Sisters in Bocking, Essex, England.

History 
John Francis Bentley, the architect of Westminster Cathedral, completed his plans for the chapel in 1898 and it was completed in May 1899.

Description 
According to Historic England, the building is

The chapel has been listed Grade II on the National Heritage List for England since 1973.

References

Churches in Braintree
Franciscan nunneries
Grade II listed Roman Catholic churches in England
Grade II listed churches in Essex
John Francis Bentley buildings
Roman Catholic churches in Essex
Roman Catholic churches completed in 1898
19th-century Roman Catholic church buildings in the United Kingdom